Carlos Felipe Martínez Diosa (born 26 May 1945) is a Cuban sprinter. He competed in the men's 400 metres at the 1968 Summer Olympics.

References

1945 births
Living people
Athletes (track and field) at the 1968 Summer Olympics
Cuban male sprinters
Olympic athletes of Cuba
Place of birth missing (living people)